Cíjara Dam is a reservoir on the Guadiana River, located in Extremadura, Spain. It was built in 1956.

Reservoirs in Extremadura
Dams in Spain
Buildings and structures in Extremadura
Guadiana